Chalarostylis is a genus of cumacean crustaceans in the Lampropidae family, containing two species, including the one formerly placed in Dasylamprops, which is now considered a synonym of Chalarostylis.

Chalarostylis elegans was described by Norman in 1879, while Chalarostylis guanchi was described as Dasylamprops guanchi by Reyss in 1978.

References

Cumacea